Jean-Pierre Jorris (21 October 1925 – 21 February 2017) was a French theatre actor.

References

1925 births
2017 deaths
French male stage actors
People from Clamart
20th-century French male actors